The Aldar Headquarters building is the first circular building of its kind in the Middle East. It is located in Al Raha, Abu Dhabi, United Arab Emirates.

The shape of this building is achieved through the use of structural diagrid, a diagonal grid of steel.

The building features the following elevators:

12-passenger elevators
2 service elevators
3 mono-space elevators
1 circular hydraulic lift
2 dumbwaiters
23 floors

Use of the golden ratio

The extent that the circle is embedded in the ground was designed around the golden ratio.

References

2010 establishments in the United Arab Emirates
Office buildings completed in 2010
Skyscraper office buildings in Abu Dhabi